P.I.S. - Politiets indsatsstyrke is a Danish, satirical mockumentary from 2001. The show was originally broadcast on TV2 Zulu.

P.I.S. pretends to be a TV-documentary about Politiets IndsatsStyrke - a caricature of the real-world Politiets Aktionsstyrke, the Danish equivalent of a SWAT team. The film crew accompanies the unit, especially officer John Schmidt (Jonas Schmidt), both at work and in private. Initially the unit is pictured very convincingly as an actual police unit but as the show progress, the unit’s missions, attitudes and actions become more and more absurd, until it is obvious to viewers that it is a satirical mockumentary. When the first episodes were shown, many viewers thought it was an actual documentary.

The abbreviation P.I.S. means piss in Danish, which should be a dead give-away about the nature of the show. The style of the show, however, convinced many people that it was a documentary, and that the abbreviation was just an unfortunate, but real, occurrence. Other Danish police and army institutions sound peculiar in Danish, when abbreviated, such as the Danish Defence Intelligence Service (da: Forsvarets Efterretningstjeneste - FE) sounding like the Danish word for fairy, or the police equivalent (PET), hence P.I.S. wasn't too far off.

The characters of the show shows an assortment of politically incorrect reactions towards the world and especially their (new) colleagues, such as racism and sexism, schadenfreude when a newly arrived female colleague accidentally shoots herself in the face and dies from her wounds, overzealousness resulting in unnecessary deaths, shooting Muslims suspects almost on sight, careless handling of loaded weapons, driving under the influence, and an almost complete lack of remorse when something has gone awry.

Cast

Regular cast 
 John played by Jonas Schmidt.
John is formally tactical leader of the team, although he is soon usurped by NC, and quickly becomes bottom of the heap. He holds a perpetual grudge against NC. Is the "main character" of the show. Is a bit of a bureaucrat after being demoted from tactical leader, especially regarding the tactical "Order to Go", always issued by Bjarne, and finds improvisation impossible, until he gets that order. Ends most episodes by buying a beer for the team at "Rosie McGee's", a Bar/restaurant in Copenhagen, Denmark.
 Bjarne played by Carsten Kressner.
The operational leader of the team. Is very media-conscious and does everything to make the team look good. Upon the arrival of NC, he actively uses NC's good looks and media talent as the team's "image", much to the other team members’ regret. Almost never finds flaws with his team - at least he won't admit it to the camera, although he is forced, from time to time to put his foot down, though always too late to really make a difference.
 NC played by Lai Yde Holgaard.
Newest man on the team, NC is a handsome-looking person with an enlarged sense of his own qualities. Is a fashion vegetarian, media-darling and at times find it difficult to tend his job, because he's participating in TV-shows, recording a pop-album, modelling etc.
 Sebastian played by Rasmus Bjerg.
The team sniper, Sebastian, usually referred to by his last name, Dvorsky, is the only married man in the tactical group. He shows extensive disregard for his surroundings and is quick to pick on his colleagues, especially the newcomers. Despite this, he is rarely chastised for it. Has numerous dubious killings on his record but never lets it interfere with his professionalism. He takes his own job very seriously and is of the misconception, that he should shoot to kill, more often than not. Dvorsky is in many ways the opposite of NC. Where NC characterizes himself as a vegetarian, Dvorsky refers to himself as a "meatarian" complaining that he gets rashes if he doesn't eat enough pork, and proudly states, that the only spice he eats, is the animal kingdoms own spice: Bacon! He finds work hard to do, if he doesn't eat, and refuses to leave the unit truck, before he has had his lunch (consisting mainly of meat).
 Svetlana played by Oksana Ivanova.
Svetlana is John's au pair, with whom he falls in love. She is later seduced by NC (who finds her irresistible, mainly due to her association with John), ticking off John, resulting in a violent episode.
 speak by Torben Sekov.
The speak was made by Torben Sekov, a much-used voice-over in Danish documentaries. This added greatly to the illusion that the show was factual. His comments sometimes downplays even the most extreme events, fooling the viewer into thinking that what just transpired, was in fact in accordance with standard procedure or something to that effect.

One Episode 
 Hassan played by Isam Subeihi.
A new member of the squad, and a P.R. scoop by Bjarne, because getting an immigrant into the force shows the unit from a positive side. Most of the team is ambiguous about or downright opposes the inclusion of Hassan. Despite proving competent, Sebastian shoots and kills him on a mission "mistaking" him for the hostage taker.
 Nina played by Katja Holm.
Finds a romantic interest in John, who refuses her, being already involved with Svetlana. Both NC and Sebastian try to sabotage her trial period. She easily beats Sebastian in a gun-assembling contest (Sebastian being the uncontested leader in that discipline in the team), and is later knocked over by play-fighting NC and Sebastian, resulting in the gun discharging in her face. Neither NC nor Sebastian mourns her death, the latter commenting with a smirk "I think she assembled that gun a bit too fast".
 Finn Ahrenkiel played by Steen Herdel.
 Susanne played by Dya Hauch.
 Rudi played by Hans Peter Hendrich.
Rudi is the German voice actor of John. In Germany the tactical leader, John, is especially famous in the North-eastern part of Germany. However as John gets fired in episode 6, season 2, he travels to Denmark to seek down John.  ".

Celebrity Guest appearances - as themselves 
 Jarl Friis Mikkelsen - Episode 11
 Jokeren (rapper) (Jesper Dahl) - Episode 6
 Peter Gantzler - Episode 6
 Nikolaj Steen - Episode 5

External links 
 

Danish comedy television series
2001 Danish television series debuts
2000s Danish television series
TV 2 Zulu original programming